Antoine Armand (born 10 September 1991) is a French politician of LREM who has been representing Haute-Savoie's 2nd constituency in the National Assembly since 2022.

See also 

 List of deputies of the 16th National Assembly of France

References 

Living people
1991 births
Deputies of the 16th National Assembly of the French Fifth Republic
21st-century French politicians
La République En Marche! politicians
Members of Parliament for Haute-Savoie